This is a list of peer-reviewed, academic journals in the field of women's studies.

Note: there are many important academic magazines that are not true peer-reviewed journals. They are not listed here.

A
Affilia
 Asian Journal of Women's Studies
 Asian Women
 Australian Feminist Studies

C
 Cadernos Pagu
 Clio. Femmes, genre, histoire

D
 Differences

E
 European Journal of Women's Studies

F
 Feminism & Psychology
 Feminist Economics
Feminist Formations
 Feminist Legal Studies
 Feminist Review
 Feminist Studies
 Feminist Theory
 Feministische Studien
 Frontiers: A Journal of Women Studies

G
 Gender and Language
 Gender & Society
 Gender, Place & Culture: A Journal of Feminist Geography
 Gender, Technology and Development
 Gender, Work and Organization

H

 Health Care for Women International
 Hypatia: A Journal of Feminist Philosophy

I

 International Journal of Gender Science and Technology
Indian Journal of Gender Studies
 International Feminist Journal of Politics
 International Journal of Feminist Approaches to Bioethics

J

 Journal of Gender Studies
 Journal of Middle East Women's Studies
 Journal of Women & Aging
 Journal of Women, Politics & Policy
 Journal of Women's Health
 Journal of Women's History

P
 PhiloSOPHIA
 Politics & Gender
 Psychology of Women Quarterly

R

 Radical Philosophy

S

 Sex Roles
 Signs: Journal of Women in Culture and Society
 Social Politics

V

 Violence Against Women

W
 Women & Health
 Women & Therapy
 Women's Health Issues
 Women's Studies in Communication
 Women's Studies International Forum
 Women's Studies Quarterly

Lists of academic journals
 
Women-related lists